Jornal do Commercio was a newspaper published in Rio de Janeiro. It was founded in 1827 by French journalist Pierre Plancher. It was the oldest newspaper in circulation in South America, until the last publication on 29 April 2016, when it ceased operations.

References

Newspapers published in Brazil
Publications established in 1827
Portuguese-language newspapers
1827 establishments in Brazil